Louise Crisp (born 1957) is a contemporary Australian poet, deckhand, and fire tower watcher.

Early life and education 
Crist was born in Omeo, Victoria and studied linguistics, anthropology, and prehistory at the Australian National University.

Career 
Crisp has worked in various jobs, including as a fire tower person on Mount Nugong, as deckhand on fishing boats in both the Northern Territory and Western Australia, and as a spokesperson for Forest Fire Management Victoria.

Poetry 
Her first collection was The luminous ocean, a shared volume with Valery Wilde's In the Half-Light, published by Friendly Street Poets in 1988. She has published several more books of poetry including written in pearl & sea fed (published by Hazard Press, New Zealand in 1994) which she wrote while working on the fire tower. This volume was shortlisted for the 1995 C. J. Dennis Prize for Poetry and the New South Wales Premier's Award.

Crisp's 2019 book, Yuiquimbiang, was described as "another wonderful addition to our literature’s re-engagement with the mosaic-continent nowadays known as Australia" and shortlisted for the 2020 Victorian Premier's Prize for Poetry.

Works 
 The luminous ocean. (Friendly Street Poets, 1988)
 pearl & sea fed. (New Zealand: Hazard Press, 1994) 
 Ruby Camp: A Snowy River series. (Melbourne: Spinifex Press, 1998) 
 Three golden fish. (Wind and Water Press, 2004) 
 Uplands: poems. (Five Islands Press, c.2007) 
 Yuiquimbiang. (Cordite Books, 2019)

Personal life 
Crisp lives in East Gippsland (Victoria) with her partner and her two daughters.

She is a canoeist.

References

External links
 Crisps' profile on Friendly Street Poets
 Series 2 on Friendly Street Poets
 Poem: River

1957 births
Living people
Australian poets
Writers from Victoria (Australia)
Australian sailors
Australian conservationists